Sa Re Ga Ma Pa Challenge USA 2008 is an Indian television singing competition show that premiered on 20 June 2008 on Zee TV channel. It is the first instalment of the Sa Re Ga Ma Pa Challenge series in US and the 6th public voting competition in the Sa Re Ga Ma Pa series. Chronologically, the show is preceded by Sa Re Ga Ma Pa L'il Champs International, however systematically it is followed by Sa Re Ga Ma Pa Challenge 2009.

Concept 
Like other singing competitions, the concept of this season of Sa Re Ga Ma Pa is to discover singing talent from the US. Auditions will be held in New York, Chicago, San Francisco, Dallas / Fort Worth and the finals will be recorded in Dallas, Texas.

Host
 Aishwarya Nigam

Judges
 Suresh Wadkar
 Aadesh Srivastav

Contestants

Top 20 finalists
Male
 Jeffrey Iqbal – 1st runner-up (27 July 2008)
 Farhan Zaidi – 2nd runner-up (27 July 2008)
 Krushanu Majmundar – eliminated (27 July 2008) - semi-finalist
 Rahul Lakhanpal – eliminated (26 July 2008)
 Vishal Bhalla – eliminated (25 July 2008)
 Anand Kannan – eliminated (19 July 2008)
 Prabhu Shankar – eliminated (18 July 2008)
 Muhibur Rehman – eliminated (12 July 2008)
 Praveen Jaligama – eliminated (4 July 2008)
 Purnash Durgaprasad – eliminated (27 June 2008)

Female
 Darshana Menon – winner (27 July 2008)
 Harini Vasudevan – eliminated (27 July 2008) - semi-finalist
 Ganga Narayanan – eliminated (27 July 2008) - semi-finalist
 Deeti Majmundar – eliminated (26 July 2008)
 Soujanya Madabhushi – eliminated (25 July 2008)
 Supriya Shridharan – eliminated (19 July 2008)
 Rasika Shekar – eliminated (18 July 2008)
 Ishmeet Kaur – eliminated (11 July 2008)
 Ujwala Chinni – eliminated (5 July 2008)
 Dr. Adeeba Akhtar – dropped out (28 June 2008)
 Note: Contestants Darshana Menon (winner), Jeffrey Iqbal (1st runner-up), & Farhan Zaidi (2nd runner-up) were accepted to participate in Sa Re Ga Ma Pa Challenge 2009 in India.

Sa Re Ga Ma Pa
2008 American television series debuts
2008 American television series endings